Großheirath is a municipality in the district of Coburg in Bavaria in Germany.

References

Coburg (district)